Gustaf Elofsson  (April 5, 1897 - March 12, 1971) was a Swedish politician. He was a member of the Centre Party. He was a member of the Parliament of Sweden (upper chamber) from 1940.

Members of the Riksdag from the Centre Party (Sweden)
1897 births
1971 deaths
Members of the Första kammaren